Umpherston is a surname and given name. Notable people with the name include:

Charles Umpherston Aitchison KCSI CIE (1832–1896), Scottish colonial administrator, Lieutenant Governor of the Punjab
Alice Marion Umpherston (1863–1957), the first female lecturer at the University of St Andrews
James Umpherston (1812–1900), farmer and politician, settler of Mount Gambier, South Australia

See also
Umpherston Sinkhole
Pumpherston